Alfuzosin, sold under the brand names Alfosoft and Uroxatral, among others, is a medication of the α1 blocker class. It is used to treat benign prostatic hyperplasia (BPH).

As an antagonist of the α1 adrenergic receptor, it works by relaxing the muscles in the prostate and bladder neck, making urination easier. 

Alfuzosin was patented in 1978 and approved for medical use in 1988. It was approved in the US for benign prostatic hyperplasia in 2003. In 2020, it was the 336th-most commonly prescribed medication in the United States, with more than 700thousand prescriptions.

Side effects 
The most common side effects are dizziness (due to postural hypotension), upper respiratory tract infection, headache, fatigue, and abdominal disturbances. Side effects include stomach pain, heartburn, and congested nose. Adverse effects of alfuzosin are similar to that of tamsulosin with the exception of retrograde ejaculation.

Chemistry 
Alfuzosin contains a stereocenter, so is chiral, with two enantiomeric forms, (R)- and (S)-alfuzosin. The drug is used as a racemate, (RS)-alfuzosin, a 1:1 mixture of the (R)- and (S)- forms.

It is provided as the hydrochloride salt.

Society and culture

Brand names
It is sold under the brand names Alfosoft, Uroxatral, Xatral, Prostetrol, and Alfural..

References

External links
 

Alpha-1 blockers
Carboxamides
Quinazolines
Tetrahydrofurans